The Hang Kasturi Mausoleum is the mausoleum of Hang Kasturi located in Jonker Walk, Melaka City, Melaka, Malaysia.

Architecture
The mausoleum architecture is much influenced by the art and architecture from India.

See also
 List of tourist attractions in Melaka

References

Buildings and structures in Malacca City
Mausoleums in Malacca